Große Lonau is a river in Lower Saxony, Germany.

Course 
The Große Lonau rises at an elevation of 730 m in the vicinity of the Hanskühnenburg on the ridge of Auf dem Acker. Then it flows mostly in a south-southwest direction to Lonau, where it merges with the Kleine Lonau. The Große Lonau discharges into the Sieber in Herzberg am Harz.

See also
List of rivers of Lower Saxony

References

Rivers of Lower Saxony
Rivers of the Harz
Göttingen (district)
Rivers of Germany